Novogolsky 2-y is a rural locality (a settlement) in Sinyavskoye Rural Settlement, Talovsky District, Voronezh Oblast, Russia. The population was 133 as of 2010.

Geography 
Novogolsky 2-y is located 39 km northeast of Talovaya (the district's administrative centre) by road. Abramovka is the nearest rural locality.

References 

Rural localities in Talovsky District